Stephen (/Arhiepiskop Ohirdski i Makedonski g.g. Stefan; born 1 May 1955) is the fifth Archbishop of Ohrid and Macedonia, metropolitan of Skopje, primate and spiritual leader of the Macedonian Orthodox Church.

Biography 
Archbishop Stefan, whose secular name is Stojan Veljanovski (Стојан Вељановски), was born on May 1, 1955, in the village of Dobrushevo, Mogila Municipality in SFR Yugoslavia, today in North Macedonia.

In 1969, he enrolled in the Macedonian Orthodox Theological Seminary of St. Clement of Ohrid in Dračevo, where he graduated in 1974. The same year he went on to study at the University of Belgrade Theological Faculty, graduating in 1979.

Upon his return to Macedonia, the Holy Synod of the Macedonian Orthodox Church named him a teacher at the Theological Seminary in Skopje. In 1980, he left for postgraduate studies at the Institute of St. Nicholas in Bari, Italy, which specializes in ecumenical-patristic and Greco-Byzantine studies. In 1982, he received a master's degree from this institute.

When he returned to Macedonia, Stefan became a lecturer at Skopje's St. Clement of Ohrid Theological Faculty.

He took his monastic vows at the St. Naum monastery in Ohrid on July 3, 1986, and on July 12 he was named Metropolitan of Zletovo and Strumica. Shortly thereafter he was enthroned as Bishop of Bregalnica and Štip.

In the following years, Bishop Stefan served as dean of the Theological Faculty in Skopje, spokesman for the Holy Synod of the Macedonian Orthodox Church, as editor in chief of the church's official gazette "Church Life" (Црковен живот) and as secretary-general of the Archbishopric of Ohrid and Macedonia.

In Ohrid on 9 and October 10, 1999, the Church National Assembly ― a congregation of clerics and laymen ― elected Bishop Stephen as head of the Macedonian Orthodox Church. Reacting to concerns that Bishop Stefan was only 44 years old when he was elected, Protodeacon Slave Projkovski said the Macedonian Orthodox Church believed in Stefan's intellectual and moral maturity. Projkovski added, however, that the future of the Church did not only depend on Archbishop Stefan since, as head of the Macedonian Orthodox Church, he was merely the first among equals.

On 16 May 2022, Archbishop Stefan became the first Archbishop of Ohrid to be canonically recognized since Dositej II, owing to the resolution by the Holy Synod of the Serbian Orthodox Church to accept the canonical status of the Macedonian Orthodox Church.

References 

1955 births
Living people
People from Mogila Municipality
Archbishops of Ohrid and Macedonia
Eastern Orthodox Christians from North Macedonia
University of Belgrade Faculty of Orthodox Theology alumni
20th-century Eastern Orthodox archbishops